BRST may refer to:
 BRST Films, a Serbian video production company
 BRST algorithm, an optimization algorithm suitable for finding the global optimum of black box functions
 BRST quantization in Yang-Mills theories, a way to quantize a gauge-symmetric field theory
 Brasília Summer Time
 Burst.com, from its stock ticker, now Democrasoft